Aron Rodrigue is the Daniel E. Koshland Professor in Jewish Culture and History at Stanford University.

Education 
 Ph.D., Harvard University, History
 A.M., Harvard University, History
 B.A., First Class Honours, University of Manchester, History

Books
  A Jewish Voice from Ottoman Salonica: The Ladino Memoir of Sa'adi Besalel a-Levi co-authored with Sarah Abrevaya Stein and Isaac Jerusalmi (Stanford University Press, 2012)
  Sephardi Jewry: A History of the Judeo-Spanish Community, 14th-20th Centuries  with Esther Benbassa, (University of California Press, 2000)

Honors & Awards

 Fellowship, Memorial Foundation for Jewish Culture (1985-1987)
 Summer Faculty Fellowship, Indiana University (1987)
 Summer Faculty Fellowship, Indiana University (1988)
 Fellowship, American Council of Learned Societies (1988)
 Outstanding Young Faculty Award, Indiana University (1988)
 Fellow, Institute for Advanced Studies, The Hebrew University of Jerusalem (1988-1989)
 The Toledano Prize for Sephardic Studies, Misgav Yerushalayim Institute, Jerusalem (1989)
 Finalist for National Jewish Book Council Prize, National Jewish Book Council (1991)
 National Jewish Book Council Honor Award in Sephardic Studies, National Jewish Book Council (1994)
 Fellowship, Stanford Humanities Center (1998)
 Fellowship, American Council of Learned Societies (1998)
 Fellow, American Academy of Jewish Research (2002 - current)
 Ina Levine Senior Scholar in Residence, Center for Advanced Studies, US Holocaust Memorial Museum (2003-2004)
 Alberto Benveniste Prize for Research in Sephardic Studies, Centre Alberto-Benveniste, Ecole Pratique des Hautes Etudes, Paris (2011)
 Chevalier dans l'Ordre des Palmes Académiques, French Ministry of Education (2013)
 Chevalier de l'Ordre des Arts et Lettres, French Ministry of Culture (2013)

References

Stanford University Department of History faculty
Living people
Year of birth missing (living people)
Alumni of the University of Manchester
Harvard University alumni